Sarnów  is a village in the administrative district of Gmina Psary, within Będzin County, Silesian Voivodeship, in southern Poland.

The village has a population of 1,791.
;)
• hej gra ktoś w mc??

References

Villages in Będzin County